Goodwin model may refer to:

 Goodwin model (economics)
 Goodwin model (biology)